Vild may refer to:

People
 Eleonora Vild (born 1969), Serbian basketball player

Places
 Vild, Sargans, Switzerland
 Ludhiana Airport, India (by ICAO code)

Other
 Vild is Swedish, Danish and Norwegian for wild.